Pterocarpus macrocarpus, or Burma padauk, is a tree native to the seasonal tropical forests of southeastern Asia: in Myanmar, Laos, Cambodia, Thailand, and Vietnam. It has been naturalized in India and the Caribbean.

Description
Pterocarpus macrocarpus is a medium-sized tree growing to 10–30 m (rarely to 39 m) tall, with a trunk up to 1.7 m diameter; it is deciduous in the dry season. The bark is flaky, grey-brown; if cut, it secretes a red gum. The leaves are 200–350 mm long, pinnate, with 9–11 leaflets. The flowers are yellow, produced in racemes 50–90 mm long. The fruit is a pod surrounded by a round wing 45–70 mm diameter, containing two or three seeds.

The wood is durable and resistant to termites; it is important, used for furniture, construction timber, cart wheels, tool handles, and posts; though not a true rosewood it is sometimes traded as such. 
The seasonal padauk flowers bloom annually around Thingyan (April) and is considered one of the national symbols of Myanmar (formerly Burma).

References

External links
 
 

macrocarpus
Trees of Indo-China
National symbols of Myanmar
Fabales of Asia